Qingshuipu Bridge is a cable-stayed bridge across the Yong River in Ningbo, Zhejiang, China which carries the G1504 Ningbo Ring Expressway. Construction started on 8 November 2007 and the bridge opened to traffic on 28 December 2011. When it was completed, it was the world's largest multi-tower split-frame cable-stayed bridge.

References

See also
List of longest cable-stayed bridge spans
List of tallest bridges

Bridges in Zhejiang
Cable-stayed bridges in China
Bridges completed in 2011